Orville Francis "Sam" Woodruff ( December 27, 1876 – July 22, 1937) was a professional baseball player. He played all of the 1904 season and part of the 1910 season for the Cincinnati Reds, primarily as a third baseman. He also had an extensive minor league baseball career, playing from 1898 until 1915.

References

External links
 

Major League Baseball third basemen
Cincinnati Reds players
Mobile Blackbirds players
Newark Colts players
Paterson Giants players
New Orleans Pelicans (baseball) players
Binghamton Crickets (1880s) players
Binghamton Bingoes players
Indianapolis Indians players
Louisville Colonels (minor league) players
St. Paul Saints (AA) players
Milwaukee Brewers (minor league) players
Memphis Chickasaws players
Baseball players from Ohio
1876 births
1937 deaths
People from Clermont County, Ohio